"Suspect" is a 1961 Australian television play. It was originally made for HSV-7 then presented as part of the General Motors Hour It was produced by Peter Cotes, who had made Long Distance.

Cotes adapted the play Suspect by Edward Percy and Reginald Denham which was based on the Sandyford murder case.

Plot
The son of Mrs Smith (née Maggie Wishart) is about to marry a doctor's daughter. A press baron, Sir Hugo, arrives who thirty years ago covered a trial where Maggie cut up her mother and father with an axe. Maggie claims she's innocent... but is she telling the truth?

Cast
Joan Miller as Mrs Smith
Kenneth Burgess as Rev. Alfred Combermere
Moira Carleton as Goodie McIntire
Michael Duffield- as Dr. Rendle
Patsy King as Janet
Clement McCallin as Sir Hugo
Fred Parslow as Robert
Bettina Welchas Lady Const

Production
The play had been adapted for US TV in 1948 and 1952 and for British TV in 1939, 1946 and 1958.

The show starred Cotes' wife, Joan Miller, who had performed in the play on British TV for the BBC in 1958.

It was one of four productions Cotes made in Australia, the others being Long Distance, Candida, and Shadow of the Vine. He said he would have made more but for the credit freeze, which was blamed for a failure to find sponsors. While Long Distance was shown while Cotes was in Australia, they other three were not broadcast until months later.

Reception
The Bulletin called it "lunacy... most   of   the   cast borrowed their   dramatics   from   a   time   when   over  acting   for   the   silents   set   the   universal style... a fusty,  trivial   play.  Condemnation   must   extend   to   those  who   accepted   it   as   suitable   for   television,  billed   it   as   a   thriller, designed   a   set   that  dominated   most   of   the   action,   and   made  this   worse   by   camera   work   that   frequently   gave   the   setting   nine-tenths   of   the  picture.".

The Age said it "commanded attention."

References

External links
 

1960s Australian television plays
1961 television plays
1962 Australian television episodes
The General Motors Hour